Michael Paul Bradley CB is a British businessman. He has served as Chief Executive of Defence Equipment and Support.

Career 
In 1995 Bradley joined Alstom Rail where he latterly served as Finance Director of their Traction business. He went on to become Finance Director of Enterprise, the support services business, in 2004, Director General (Resources) and Finance Director of Defence Equipment and Support in January 2012 and then Chief Executive in January 2018. In May 2018 he was replaced as Chief Executive by Sir Simon Bollom.

Bradley was appointed a Companion of the Order of the Bath (CB) in the 2017 New Year Honours.

References

Offices held 

Living people
British industrialists
20th-century English businesspeople
21st-century English businesspeople
Companions of the Order of the Bath
Year of birth missing (living people)